The 1964 Estonian SSR Football Championship was won by Norma.

League table

References 

Estonian Football Championship
Est
Football